The Des Moines Tribune was a daily afternoon newspaper published in Des Moines, Iowa. It was founded in 1906 and purchased in 1908 by the Cowles family, which owned the Des Moines Register. The newspapers shared production and business operations, but maintained separate editorial staffs which often behaved as rivals and competitors. The newspaper ceased publication in 1982.

References

Defunct newspapers published in Iowa
Publications disestablished in 1982
Publications established in 1906
1906 establishments in Iowa
1982 disestablishments in Iowa
Mass media in Des Moines, Iowa